Sir William John Peel (16 June 1912 – 8 May 2004) was a British Conservative politician who served as Member of Parliament for Leicester South East from 1957 to 1974.

Early life

He attended Wellington College and Queens' College, Cambridge. His first career was in the Colonial Service; he survived imprisonment by the Japanese during the Second World War, when he was stationed in Singapore, to later serve terms as British Resident in Brunei and then Resident Commissioner in the Gilbert and Ellice Islands colony (now Kiribati and Tuvalu) before retiring in 1952. His father Sir William Peel had been Governor of Hong Kong.

Political career

Peel was elected as a member of the House of Commons at a by-election in 1957. In July 1959, he provoked angry responses from the House when he reacted to the Mau Mau rebellion in Kenya by stating: "There are obvious risks in dealing with desperate and sub-human individuals." In the resulting debate, Peel's remarks were denounced by Enoch Powell, who commented: "We cannot, we dare not, in Africa of all places, fall below our highest standards in the acceptance of responsibility". Though Peel's tenure of minor government positions was uninterrupted, he never reached the Cabinet.

He was a zealous advocate of British involvement in Europe, through the Council of Europe, the Western European Union, and eventually membership—of which he was a leading advocate—in the European Communities. In 1972, he was chosen President of the North Atlantic Assembly. In the following year he was knighted, and also became one of the first British members of the European Parliament.

References

1912 births
2004 deaths
Conservative Party (UK) MPs for English constituencies
People educated at Wellington College, Berkshire
UK MPs 1955–1959
UK MPs 1959–1964
UK MPs 1964–1966
UK MPs 1966–1970
UK MPs 1970–1974
World War II civilian prisoners held by Japan
Alumni of Queens' College, Cambridge
Conservative Party (UK) MEPs
MEPs for the United Kingdom 1973–1979
Knights Bachelor
Politicians awarded knighthoods
Colonial Administrative Service officers
Governors of the Gilbert and Ellice Islands
Administrators in British Brunei
Ministers in the Macmillan and Douglas-Home governments, 1957–1964